"Please Talk to My Heart" is a single by American country music artist Johnny "Country" Mathis. It was released in 1963, and peaked at number 14 on the Billboard Hot Country Singles chart. The song was written by Jimmy Lee Fautheree and Johnny Mathis.

The song was covered in 1964 by Ray Price. Price's version peaked at number 7 on the Billboard Hot Country Singles chart. It also reached number 1 on the RPM Country Tracks chart in Canada.

Freddy Fender also released a cover of the song in 1980. Fender's version peaked at number 82 on the Billboard Hot Country Singles chart.

Chart performance

Johnny "Country" Mathis

Ray Price

Freddy Fender

References

1963 singles
1964 singles
1980 singles
"Country" Johnny Mathis songs
Ray Price (musician) songs
Freddy Fender songs
1963 songs
Columbia Records singles
Songs written by "Country" Johnny Mathis